Parliamentary elections were held in Algeria on 20 September 1964. The country was a one-party state at the time, with the National Liberation Front as the sole legal party. Voter turnout was 85%.

Results

References

Algeria
Legislative election
Elections in Algeria
One-party elections
Algerian legislative election